Omar Faruk Osman is a Somali journalist and trade unionist, who is the General Secretary of the Federation of Somali Trade Unions (FESTU). As the head of the National Union of Somali Journalists (NUSOJ)., he is also a member of the Executive Committee of the Global Union Federation - the International Federation of Journalists (IFJ).

References

Somalian journalists
Trade unionists
Year of birth missing (living people)
Living people